Joan Barry (born May 31, 1941) is an American politician. She was elected to the Missouri House of Representatives in 1996 and was re-elected in 1998, and 2000. In 2004 she was an unsuccessful candidate for U.S. Congress losing the Democratic primary election to Russ Carnahan. Barry is also a Registered Nurse who has worked in the field of obstetrics at St. Anthony's Hospital in St. Louis County. She is married to Phil Barry, who is also a former Missouri State Representative.

Russ Carnahan filed a complaint with the Federal Elections Commission regarding the activities of the Barry campaign, and that of State Senator Jeff Smith. No penalty was imposed.

References

External links
 Biography from Missouri House of Representatives

1941 births
Living people
American nurses
American women nurses
Members of the Missouri House of Representatives
Politicians from St. Louis
Women state legislators in Missouri
21st-century American women